The river Macta is in Algeria.

It is formed by the Habra ( long) and the Sig ( long), which rise in the Amour Range and flowing north before uniting in a marshy plain, from whence the Macta debouches.

At the Battle of Macta fought on 28 June 1835, Algerian Arab tribes defeated a French colonial army.

Notes

References

Further reading
 Blondel, J. (1963). Situation de la sauvagine dans le Maghreb. In : Proceedings of the first European meeting on waterfowl conservation : 65–67. The Nature Conservancy, London.
 Boucheker, A. (2012). Dynamique de la métapopulation de flamants roses en Méditerranée : rôle des zones humides d'Afrique du nord et implications pour la conservation. Thèse de doctorat, Ecole pratique des Hautes Etudes (171 pages).
 Ghodbani, T. et Amokrane, K. (2103). La zone humide de la Macta : un espace à protéger sur le littoral ouest de l'Algérie. Physio-Géo, 7 : 139-155.
 Hovette, C. & Kowalski, H. (1972). Dénombrements de la sauvagine dans le Maghreb, Janvier / Février 1972. Rapport polycopié au B.I.R.S. Bull. B.I.R.S. 34 : 42–58.
 Isenmann, P. & Moali, A. (2000). Birds of Algeria. Société d'Etudes Ornithologiques de France, Paris, 336p.
 Jacobs, P. & Ochando, B. (1972). Répartition géographique et importance numérique des anatidés hivernants en Algérie. Le Gerfaut, 69 : 239–251.
 Krissat, K. & Horr, K. (1976). Les marais de la Macta : biocénoses. DES, Université d'Oran.
 Ledant, J.P. & Van Dijck, G. (1977). Situation des zones humides algériennes et de leur avifaune. Aves, 14 : 217–232.
 Masson, R. (1976). La végétation des marais de la Macta (Région de Bou-Nefer). Bull. Soc. Géo. et Archéol. d'Oran : 60–65.
 Metzmacher, M. (1979a). Les oiseaux de la Macta et de sa région (Algérie) : Non passereaux. Aves, 3-4 : 89–123.
 Metzmacher, M. (1979 b). Note sur l'avifaune estivale de l'Est oranais (Algérie), de la Camargue (France) et du Guadalquivir (Espagne). INA, Séminaire international sur l'avifaune algérienne 5-11 juin 1979.
 Morgan, N. C. (1982). An ecological survey of standing waters in North-west Africa: II. Site descriptions for Tunisia and Algeria. Biological Conservation, 24 : 83–113.
 Morgan, N. C. & Boy, V. (1982). An ecological survey of standing waters in North-west Africa: I. Rapid survey and classification. Biological Conservation, 24 : 5-44.
 Simmoneau, P. (1952). La végétation halophile de la plaine de Perrégaux. Thèse de Doctorat ès-sciences, Alger.
 Simonneau, P. (1954). La végétation des sols salés d'Oranie, Les groupements à Atriplex dans les plaines sublittorales. Annales agronomiques, 2 : 225 – 257.
 Simmoneau, P. & Santa, S. (1951). Végétation et flore de la forêt de la Macta (Oran). Annexe de la carte de la végétation de l'Algérie. Feuille d'Oran : 1-24.

Rivers of Algeria